The Sikkim treecreeper (Certhia discolor) is a species of bird in the treecreeper family.

It is found in Bhutan, Nepal and Northeast India.

Its natural habitats are temperate forests and subtropical or tropical moist montane forests.

The form C. d. manipurensis of southern Manipur and southwestern Burma has a rich cinnamon throat and breast, and molecular evidence and is usually now treated as a separate species, the Hume's treecreeper, C. manipurensis Hume, 1850.

Notes

References
Harrap and Quinn, Tits, Nuthatches and Treecreepers 

Sikkim treecreeper
Birds of Nepal
Birds of Bhutan
Birds of Northeast India
Fauna of Sikkim
Sikkim treecreeper
Sikkim treecreeper
Taxonomy articles created by Polbot